Cadfael is a British mystery television series, broadcast on ITV between 1994 and 1998, based on The Cadfael Chronicles novels written by Ellis Peters. Produced by Central, it starred Derek Jacobi as the medieval detective and title character, Brother Cadfael. The complete series was released on DVD on 24 August 2009. The series aired in the United States as part of the Mystery! series.

Plots and setting
This detective series is set in the 12th century in England, mainly at the Benedictine Abbey in Shrewsbury where Brother Cadfael lives. The titles are from books by Ellis Peters, who wrote The Cadfael Chronicles. The television programmes were filmed in Hungary, as the original abbey in Shrewsbury no longer stands, just the church. The episodes aired in the UK from 1994 to 1998. The novels were written in sequence, marking specific years beginning in 1137 and ending in 1145. Not all the 21 novels were filmed, and there are differences between the plots and characters in the novels and those portrayed on the screen in some episodes, as well as the sequence.

Cast
 Derek Jacobi as Brother Cadfael
 Sean Pertwee as Sheriff Hugh Beringar (Series 1)
 Eoin McCarthy as Sheriff Hugh Beringar (Series 2–3)
 Anthony Green as Sheriff Hugh Beringar (Series 4)
 Michael Culver as Prior Robert
 Julian Firth as Brother Jerome
 Peter Copley as Abbot Heribert (Series 1)
 Terrence Hardiman as Abbot Radulfus (Guest in Series 1, Main for Series 2–4)
 Mark Charnock as Brother Oswin (Series 1–3)
 Albie Woodington as Sergeant Warden (Series 1–3)

Episodes

Series 1 (1994)
Guest stars in this series include Christian Burgess, Michael Grandage, Steven Mackintosh, Sara Stephens, Jonathan Firth, Tara Fitzgerald, Sarah Badel, Jonny Lee Miller, Jamie Glover, Jonathan Hyde and John Bennett.

Series 2 (1995–1996)
Guest stars in this series include Ronan Vibert, Christien Anholt, Julian Glover, Louisa Millwood-Haigh, Ian Reddington, Ian McNeice, John Dallimore, Daniel Betts and Anna Friel.

Series 3 (1997)
Guest stars in this series include Kitty Aldridge, Tom Mannion, Crispin Bonham-Carter and Catherine Cusack.

Series 4 (1998)
Guest stars in this series include George Irving, Benedict Sandiford, Louise Delamere, Natasha Pyne, Jonathan Tafler, Richard Lintern, Gregor Truter, Terence Beesley, Sioned Jones, Natasha Little and Lee Ingleby.

Reception

Reviewing the episode "The Rose Rent", Matthew Bond stated "The series does have a curiously theatrical style to it, where the rather contrived medieval bustle stops while the principal actors deliver their lines and then starts again when they have finished. Still, it’s different, ambitious and Jacobi is in it — which makes three big pluses." In an article discussing depictions of religious characters on British television, Ben Dowell praised Cadfael. Dowell stated "thanks to some gripping stories, good production values and a brilliant performance from Derek Jacobi as the herbalist and former crusading knight, this adaptation of the Ellis Peters books became a regular viewing habit for millions".

Comparison to the novels

 "One Corpse Too Many" was filmed mostly in Hungary. The adaptation for television stuck closely to the original novel, with only minor plot or script deviations to cater to the different medium. 
 "The Sanctuary Sparrow" was once again mostly filmed on location in Hungary. 
 In the "Leper of Saint Giles", Heribert (Peter Copley) is the abbot, while in the novel, Radulfus has been the Abbot for nearly a year. 
 "Monk's Hood" is a close adaptation of the original novel. 
 In "The Virgin in the Ice", the plot is significantly changed from the original novel. The action is moved from Ludlow to Cadfael's "home" abbey of Shrewsbury, Brother Elyas's part was replaced by that of Cadfael's young and callow assistant in the herb gardens, Brother Oswin, and extra plot elements were introduced to explain the presence of the brigands led by le Gaucher, and the final unmasking of the murderer. 
 "The Devil's Novice" is largely faithful to the book, apart from renaming Aspley Manor to Ashby. There is an extended prologue showing Clemence's overnight stay at Aspley, where he alienates everyone with his arrogant and patronizing manner, except Rosanna, who flirts with him shamelessly. Brother Mark's role in the novel is fulfilled by Cadfael's earnest assistant, Brother Oswin. Hugh Beringar travels out of Shrewsbury, leaving his less-subtle deputy, Sergeant Warden, in charge, who repeatedly clashes with Cadfael over the solution to Clemence's murder. Under pressure from Canon Eluard, Warden is all too eager to condemn first Harald, and then Meriet, for the crime. Janyn is caught as he is trying to flee the Abbey, confesses, and is last seen being marched to gaol, to await execution.
 "A Morbid Taste for Bones" makes some changes, including secondary characters and proper names. Brother John and Annest are not included, leaving only one set of young lovers for the viewer to follow. The tension between the Welsh villagers and the English monastics is played up considerably, and the acquisition of St. Winifrede is made more dangerous thereby. To that end, the naive and charming Father Huw is recharacterised as the suspicious and rather grubby Father Ianto, who opposes the saint's removal and castigates the monks for haggling over her bones as if she were a bone at a butcher's stall. Bened the smith, while retaining his name, also loses much of his openhearted good nature, being both a suspicious rival of Rhisiart's and a vehement accuser of the monks themselves. In the climax of the adaptation, Brother Columbanus' confession is drawn out by less supernatural means than in the novel. Instead of being hoodwinked by Sioned in the dark, Columbanus confesses to a fevered figure of his own imagination. He is egged on to this by Cadfael, who pretends to see a figure of light bearing down upon them as they keep their vigil in Saint Winifrede's church. Sioned's part is to stay hidden as a witness, but when Columbanus relates with what joy he struck down her father in the saint's name, Sioned loses control and flies at him, with disastrous consequences as Columbanus realizes that he has been tricked. Sioned's lover, renamed from Engelard to Godwin, appears to defend Sioned, and Colombanus's accidental death occurs as in the novel. However, Columbanus' own motives are a good deal more ambiguous in the television adaptation. He innocently denies any ambition on his own part to be "the youngest head under a mitre," and his actions appear to stem from religious fervour and criminal insanity, rather than from a cold, calculated pass at fame. Otherwise, the episode remains primarily faithful to the text, with the necessary exception of being well into Abbott Radulfus' tenure at the abbey, instead of introducing the series.
 "The Rose Rent" adaptation makes some changes from the book. The most significant change is that Miles is motivated not by greed, but by secret love for his cousin, and first attacks the rose bush to convince her to let go of her devotion to her deceased husband. Another change is that Cadfael gives the young wife a potion to ease her terminally ill husband's pain, warning her that too much will kill him; in the next scene, the man is dead, implying a mercy killing. In the book, there is no such implication. The husband dies of his illness three years before the novel opens, with no suggestion that Cadfael or the widow acted to hasten his end. 
 "Saint Peter's Fair" is an adaptation that contains a shocking twist near the end, different from the novel. It pits Cadfael and Hugh Beringar against each other, with Hugh's loyalty to King Stephen and Cadfael's sense of true justice making them opponents (though they do reconcile at the end of the episode). In the series of novels, the friendship of the two is never imperiled. 
 "The Raven in the Foregate" focuses on Cadfael's efforts to prove that Eleanor, called Eluned in the novel, was murdered rather than a suicide and his own guilt at having sent her to Father Ailnoth for confession. Other differences include name changes: "Saran" becomes "Mary" and "Benet" becomes "Edward"; Edward takes over the role played in the novel by Torold Blund from One Corpse Too Many; the addition of Eleanor's blind sister Catherine and deletion of the characters Torold, Father Ailnoth's housekeeper Diota and Torold's fellow squire Ninian.
 In "The Holy Thief", Prior Herluin and Brother Tutilo, a novice, arrive at Shrewsbury unexpectedly from Ramsey Abbey, which has just been destroyed in the civil war. Tutilo has had a vision of St. Winifred. Herluin seizes on this as an excuse to extract the saint's lucrative relics from Shrewsbury, which since acquiring the relics has been receiving hefty sums in donations from pilgrims praying for intercession from St. Winifred. Shrewsbury's Abbot Radulfus has reluctantly agreed to loan out his saint when a bequest arrives for Tutilo: Lady Donata has left him a necklace so valuable that they can afford to rebuild Ramsey Abbey, though that does not seem to have been her intent. While he no longer needs St. Winifred, Prior Herluin is not ready to give her up. When the relics and the necklace disappear, along with Daalny, a singer enslaved to a minstrel and a friend of Tutilo, the Abbot sends Cadfael after them. Daalny turns out to have been abducted and Cadfael finds her and the relics, but the necklace is gone and shortly the hireling who grabbed Daalny and the valuables is found dead almost on Cadfael's doorstep, his head bashed in with a rock. This version follows the main plot of the novel, but omits the subplot of Prior Herluin's efforts to reclaim Sulien Blount, a former novice at Ramsey Abbey; changes the name of the murder victim from "Aldhelm" to "Alfred"; changes the identity of the murderer; alters the gift from Lady Donata to Tutilo from a psaltery to a jewelled necklace, and her motive for giving it to him; and makes the character of Lord Beaumont far more arrogant, cynical and cruel than the character in the novel. 
 "The Potter's Field" focuses on Brother Ruald, a potter who left his wife to join Shrewsbury Abbey a year before the story begins. A local nobleman donates a field to the Abbey. While working in the field, which is near Ruald's former home, the brothers discover the bones of a woman who they suspect is Ruald's abandoned wife Generys. 
 "The Pilgrim of Hate" varies widely from the novel. In this version, a well-aged corpse is found in the baggage of the pilgrims on Saint Winifred's day, and its identity, not the murder of a faraway knight, becomes the subject of the mystery. Matthew (named "Luc" in the TV series) and Ciaran are brothers, pointing fingers as to who is responsible for their father's death. In this adaptation Luc is the villain. Crippled Rhun (named "Walter" in the TV series), far from being one of Cadfael's most promising future novices, confirms Father Abbot's suspicions that he fakes his condition to earn the charity of those around him; his sister Melangell has been forced by guilt to wait on him hand and foot, even stealing to support their needs. It was the last of Ellis Peters' novels to be adapted for the screen.

References

External links

 Cadfael at Epguides.com

1990s British drama television series
1990s British mystery television series
1994 British television series debuts
1998 British television series endings
English-language television shows
Historical mystery television series
ITV crime dramas
ITV television dramas
Novel series
Television shows based on British novels
Television shows produced by Central Independent Television
Catholic drama television series
Television series by ITV Studios
Television series set in the 12th century
Television shows set in Shropshire